Wu Nai-ren (born 18 December 1947) is a Taiwanese politician. He is the former Secretary-General of the Democratic Progressive Party. When Cho Jung-tai declared his intention to run for the party chairmanship in December 2018, Wu withdrew from the party to protest Cho's candidacy.

References

Living people
1947 births
National Taiwan Ocean University alumni
Democratic Progressive Party (Taiwan) politicians
Politicians of the Republic of China on Taiwan from Keelung
Taiwanese Ministers of the Interior
Taiwanese people of Hoklo descent